Ariana University, also known as Ariana Institute of Higher Education, is a private university having two campuses, in Kabul and Jalalabad, Afghanistan. The university was established in 2004 by Abdul Haq Danishmal and his wife Tahira Danishmal for the Afghan refugees who graduated from different refugee schools in Pakistan .

References

Universities in Afghanistan
Educational institutions established in 2004
2004 establishments in Afghanistan
Education in Afghanistan
Private universities in Afghanistan